Jose Santos or José Santos may refer to:

 José Santos Becerra
 José Santos Chocano (1875–1934)
 José Santos González Vera (1897–1970), a Chilean anarchist writer
 José Santos Guardiola (1816–1862)
 José Santos Quinteros (1865–1951), a Bolivian lawyer, professor and politician
 José Santos Poyatos (born 1962), an athlete from Spain
 José Santos Ramírez (c. 1790–1851), an Argentine soldier
 Jose Santos Rios (1939–2018), a Northern Mariana Islands politician
 José Santos Romero (born 1951), an Argentine football manager and former player
 José Santos Salas (1888–1955), a Chilean physician and politician
 José Santos Valdés (born 1997), a Mexican sport shooter
 José Santos Zelaya (1853–1919), President of Nicaragua